The 2022–23 Taoyuan Pauian Pilots season was the franchise's 3rd season, its third season in the P. LEAGUE+ (PLG), its 3rd in Taoyuan City. The Pilots signed Iurgi Caminos as their head coach.

On October 6, 2022, the team was renamed Taoyuan Pauian Pilots.

Draft 

The Pilots acquired 2022 first-round draft pick from New Taipei Kings in exchange for 2021 first-round draft pick. The Pilots acquired 2022 first-round draft pick and Chieng Li-Huan from Formosa Taishin Dreamers in exchange for Lin Yao-Tsung and Wu Chia-Chun. On August 5, 2022, the third rounder Lu Tsai Yu-Lun has signed with the TaiwanBeer HeroBears of the T1 League.

Standings

Roster

Game log

Preseason 

|-style="background:#fcc"
| 1 || October 9 || @Dreamers || L 88–108 || Lu Chun-Hsiang (21) || Chieng Li-Huan (6) || Ricci Rivero (8) || Fengshan Arena3,668 || 0–1
|-style="background:#cfc"
| 2 || October 10 || @Kings || W 105–84 || Jason Washburn (21) || Jason Washburn (12) || Chieng Li-Huan (6) || Fengshan Arena3,306 || 1–1

Regular season 

|-style="background:#fcc"
| 1 || November 12 || @Kings || L 91–104 || Jason Washburn (25) || Sani Sakakini (13) || Lu Chun-Hsiang (5) || Xinzhuang Gymnasium4,493 || 0–1
|-style="background:#fcc"
| 2 || November 20 || @Dreamers || L 77–88 || Sakakini, Shih C. (18) || Sani Sakakini (13) || Chen K., Lu, Sakakini, Shih C. (4) || Intercontinental Basketball Stadium3,000 || 0–2
|-style="background:#cfc"
| 3 || November 27 || @Steelers || W 108–78 || Lu, Sakakini (21) || Sani Sakakini (15) || Huang Hung-Han (11) || Fengshan Arena3,250 || 1–2

|-style="background:#fcc"
| 4 || December 2 || @Kings || L 88–93 || Jason Washburn (25) || Jason Washburn (11) || Shih Chin-Yao (6) || Xinzhuang Gymnasium2,835 || 1–3
|-style="background:#cfc"
| 5 || December 4 || @Lioneers || W 94–80 || Lu Chun-Hsiang (21) || Jeff Ayres (15) || Shih Chin-Yao (8) || Hsinchu County Stadium4,062 || 2–3
|-style="background:#cfc"
| 6 || December 10 || Lioneers || W 102–79 || Jeff Ayres (23) || Sani Sakakini (13) || Pai, Shih (6) || Taoyuan Arena3,286 || 3–3
|-style="background:#cfc"
| 7 || December 11 || Steelers || W 100–83 || Jason Washburn (30) || Jason Washburn (15) || Pai Yao-Cheng (8) || Taoyuan Arena2,187 || 4–3
|-style="background:#cfc"
| 8 || December 17 || Kings || W 88–74 || Chen Kuan-Chuan (18) || Sani Sakakini (8) || Sani Sakakini (4) || Taoyuan Arena2,632 || 5–3
|-style="background:#cfc"
| 9 || December 18 || Dreamers || W 84–80 || Shih Chin-Yao (18) || Jeff Ayres (10) || Huang, Lu, Sakakini, Shih (4) || Taoyuan Arena2,283 || 6–3
|-style="background:#cfc"
| 10 || December 24 || Lioneers || W 103–60 || Jason Washburn (27) || Jason Washburn (15) || Pai Yao-Cheng (5) || Taoyuan Arena2,658 || 7–3
|-style="background:#cfc"
| 11 || December 25 || Braves || W 90–85 || Sani Sakakini (28) || Jeff Ayres (12) || Pai Yao-Cheng (4) || Taoyuan Arena3,659 || 8–3

|-style="background:#cfc"
| 12 || January 1 || @Lioneers || W 105–90 || Lu Chun-Hsiang (29) || Jeff Ayres (13) || Huang, Lu, Pai, Sakakini (4) || Hsinchu County Stadium4,574 || 9–3
|-style="background:#cfc"
| 13 || January 6 || @Steelers || W 110–97 || Lu Chun-Hsiang (28) || Sani Sakakini (12) || Sakakini, Shih (5) || Fengshan Arena1,283 || 10–3
|-style="background:#cfc"
| 14 || January 15 || Dreamers || W 93–76 || Lu Chun-Hsiang (24) || Sani Sakakini (13) || Sani Sakakini (6) || Taoyuan Arena3,868 || 11–3
|-style="background:#fcc"
| 15 || January 28 || @Braves || L 74–86 || Lu, Sakakini (16) || Sani Sakakini (14) || Pai Yao-Cheng (4) || Taipei Heping Basketball Gymnasium7,000 || 11–4
|-style="background:#cfc"
| 16 || January 31 || Lioneers || W 88–70 || Jeff Ayres (21) || Jeff Ayres (14) || Lu Chun-Hsiang (6) || Taoyuan Arena2,688 || 12–4

|-style="background:#cfc"
| 17 || February 7 || @Lioneers || W 106–92 || Lu Chun-Hsiang (25) || Jeff Ayres (13) || Chen Kuan-Chuan (5) || Hsinchu County Stadium3,560 || 13–4
|-style="background:#fcc"
| 18 || February 11 || Braves || L 78–80 || Jeff Ayres (16) || Jeff Ayres (17) || Lu Chun-Hsiang (4) || Taoyuan Arena3,986 || 13–5
|-style="background:#cfc"
| 19 || February 12 || Lioneers || W 95–81 || Sani Sakakini (22) || Jeff Ayres (11) || Lu Chun-Hsiang (6) || Taoyuan Arena2,367 || 14–5
|-style="background:#fcc"
| 20 || February 17 || @Dreamers || L 81–86 || Lu Chun-Hsiang (20) || Ayres, Sakakini (9) || Pai Yao-Cheng (6) || Intercontinental Basketball Stadium2,618 || 14–6
|-style="background:#fcc"
| 21 || February 19 || @Braves || L 84–86 || Jason Washburn (25) || Jeff Ayres (15) || Chen Kuan-Chuan (6) || Taipei Heping Basketball Gymnasium6,048 || 14–7
|-style="background:#fcc"
| 22 || February 25 || Kings || L 73–77 || Jason Washburn (20) || Jason Washburn (12) || Huang, Shih, Washburn (4) || Taoyuan Arena3,789 || 14–8
|-style="background:#cfc"
| 23 || February 26 || Braves || W 83–80 || Jason Washburn (24) || Jeff Ayres (10) || Lu Chun-Hsiang (5) || Taoyuan Arena3,857 || 15–8

|-style="background:#fcc"
| 24 || March 4 || Kings || L 95–98 || Jeff Ayres (26) || Jeff Ayres (15) || Shih Chin-Yao (6) || Taoyuan Arena2,669 || 15–9
|-style="background:#fcc"
| 25 || March 5 || Steelers || L 63–93 || Shih Chin-Yao (13) || Jeff Ayres (12) || Pai Yao-Cheng (4) || Taoyuan Arena4,300 || 15–10
|-style="background:#fcc"
| 26 || March 18 || Dreamers || L 77–85 || Jason Washburn (21) || Jason Washburn (19) || Pai Yao-Cheng (5) || Taoyuan Arena2073 || 15–11
|-style="background:#fcc"
| 27 || March 19 || Steelers || L 86–99 || Lu Chun-Hsiang (30) || Jason Washburn (10) || Pai Yao-Cheng (7) || Taoyuan Arena4,300 || 15–12
|-
| 28 || March 26 || @Steelers ||  ||  ||  ||  || Fengshan Arena || 
|-
| 29 || March 28 || @Kings ||  ||  ||  ||  || Xinzhuang Gymnasium || 

|-
| 30 || April 1 || @Kings ||  ||  ||  ||  || Xinzhuang Gymnasium || 
|-
| 31 || April 4 || Braves ||  ||  ||  ||  || Taoyuan Arena || 
|-
| 32 || April 8 || Kings ||  ||  ||  ||  || Taoyuan Arena || 
|-
| 33 || April 9 || Dreamers ||  ||  ||  ||  || Taoyuan Arena || 
|-
| 34 || April 14 || Steelers ||  ||  ||  ||  || Taoyuan Arena || 
|-
| 35 || April 16 || @Dreamers ||  ||  ||  ||  || Intercontinental Basketball Stadium || 
|-
| 36 || April 23 || @Braves ||  ||  ||  ||  || Taipei Heping Basketball Gymnasium || 
|-
| 37 || April 30 || @Dreamers ||  ||  ||  ||  || Intercontinental Basketball Stadium || 

|-
| 38 || May 5 || @Lioneers ||  ||  ||  ||  || Hsinchu County Stadium || 
|-
| 39 || May 7 || @Braves ||  ||  ||  ||  || Taipei Heping Basketball Gymnasium || 
|-
| 40 || May 13 || @Steelers ||  ||  ||  ||  || Fengshan Arena ||

Player Statistics 
<noinclude>

Regular season

Transactions

Trades

Free Agency

Additions

Subtractions

Awards

Players of the Week

Players of the Month

References 

Taoyuan Pauian Pilots seasons
Taoyuan Pauian Pilots